Kinnot (also kinnos, kinoth, qinot, qinoth; singular kinah, qinah or kinnah) are Hebrew dirges (sad poems) or elegies. The term is used to refer both to dirges in the Hebrew Bible, and also to later poems which are traditionally recited by Jews on Tisha B'Av.

In the Bible

In the Hebrew Bible, the term kinah or qinah refers to a dirge or lament, especially as sung by Jewish professional mourning women.

The Jerusalem Bible refers to Isaiah 47 as a qinah or "lament for Babylon", and to Ezekiel 19 as a qinah or lamentation over the rulers of Israel. A. W. Streane suggests that , on the prophesied downfall of Jerusalem, is written "in Ḳinah metre".

Tisha BeAv recitation
On Tisha B'Av, Jews traditionally recite a series of elegiac poems, known as kinnot, after the evening and morning prayers. These poems mourn the destruction of both the First and Second Temple in Jerusalem and other tragedies in Jewish history, including the Crusades, the Expulsion of Jews from Spain and the Holocaust.  The kinnot are recited on the night of Tisha B'Av after reciting the Book of Lamentations, which was also called Kinnot in the Talmudic era before it assumed its more familiar name  ʾĒkhāh.

Development of the Ashkenazic kinnot

Many kinnot were composed by Rabbi Elazar Hakalir, who likely lived in the 6th-7th centuries. His kinnot resemble the structure and content of the Book of Lamentations. For example, one of his kinnot begins each stanza with the word ʾĒkhāh, the opening word of Lamentations.  He often writes stanzas in an alphabetical acrostic, similar to the first four chapters of Lamentations.  The style deals primarily with the destruction of the Second Temple, similar to Lamentations which mourns the destruction of the First Temple.

The main impetus for creation of new kinnot during the Middle Ages was the Crusades, in which Christian mobs decimated many Jewish communities.  The kinnot deal with the then-current tragedy of the Crusades, no longer focusing on the destruction of the Temple in the past.  The loss of the Torah and its scholars, instead of the loss of the Temple, occupies a central theme.

Rabbi Judah Halevi wrote a kinnah of a different nature of the kinnot.  In his poem Tziyon Halo Tishali, rather than expressing pain and despair over the tragedies of the distant or near past, he expresses a longing for returning to Jerusalem.  Many later poets copied him.

Sephardic kinnot

The various Sephardic communities of North Africa and the Middle East have a rich tradition of kinnot. The following is an extensive list based on the practices of North Africa (Morocco and Tunisia). See also the Hebrew wikipedia page קינות לתשעה באב

Evening kinnot

 Divrey Nevi'im (דברי נביאים)
 Lu Yishqelu Re'ay (לו ישקלו רעי)
 Nishmat Shedudim (נשמת שדודים)
 Shanah BeShanah (שנה בשנה אהגה כיונה / כי עיר עדינה היתה לזונה)
 Yonah Nikh'avah (יונה נכאבה נפשה דאבה / היכל דר ערבות יום יום סובבה)
 Shim'u VeHa'azinu (שמעו והאזינו ואדברה אני / אומרה לאל סלעי למה שכחתני)
 Nishmat Yeladim (נשמת ילדים שוממים על חורבן אריאל)
 Et Oyveḥa El (את אויביך אל תשמיד ותחריב / בעגלה ובזמן קריב)
 Yom Kemo Ned (יום כמו נד עמדו דמעי בפני / על קדושים זרע ברוכי ה׳)
 Ad An Tzvi Muddaḥ (עד אן צבי מדח ואין מקבץ לו / נגש וגם נענח גבר מאד חילו )
 Ashaher Adati (אשחר עדתי)
 Eftaḥ pi Lehodot (אפתח פי להודות)
 Aryeh Sha'ag (אריה שאג)
 Eykh Mishkani Elyon (איך משכני עליון)
 HaLanofelim Tequmah (הלנופלים תקומה)
 Nishmat Emunim (נשמת אמונים)
 Nilah lehelil (נלאה להיליל)
 Heikhal Adonai ('היכל ה)
 Yom Nilḥamu Bi (יום נלחמו בי)
 Qol Aholah Tityapeaḥ (קול אהלה תתיפח)
 Bore Ad Ana (בורא עד אנא)
 Al Naharot Bavel (על נהרות בבל) is read from Tehillim
 Then the evening Arvit service is said. The kinnot continue after the Amidah:
 Lemi Evkeh (למי אבכה)
 Megillat Eykhah/Lamentations (מגילת איכה) is then read, followed by:
 Az Baḥata'enu (אז בחטאנו חרב מקדש)  Text and Melodies
 Zekhor Adonai Meh Hayah Lanu (זכר ה׳ מה היה לנו)
 Beleyl Zeh Yivkayun (בליל זה יבכיון)
 Midey Shanah Qinnah (מדי שנה קינה בליל זה מזומנה)
 Al Zeh Hayah Daveh Libenu (על זה היה דוה לבנו ועל אלה חשכו עינינו)
 Al Leyl Ḥorban Heykhal Miqdash (על ליל חרבן היכל מקדש / מדי ליל זה ספד יחדש / על עיר קדש ועל המקדש)
 Oy Ki Yarad Esh Min Hashamayim Liyrushalayim (אוי כי ירד אש מן השמים לירושלים עיני עיני יורדה מים)
 Zechor Adonai Liyhudah Ulefrayim (זכור ה' ליהודה ולאפרים)
 Alekhem Edah Qedoshah (אליכם עדה קדושה אשאל מכם שאלות / מה נשתנה הלילה הזה מכל הלילות) Text and Melodies
 Oy Ki Qinat Rabbat (אוי כי קינת רבת מפי בן ומפי בת / ויהי נעם נשבת במוצאי השבת), said only at the conclusion of Shabbat
 Ani Hagever (אני הגבר אקונן), said only at the conclusion of Shabbat
 Az Baḥata'enu (אז בחטאנו חרב מקדש), composed by Eleazar ben Killir
 The years since the destruction of the Temple are then counted (מניין שנות החורבן). 
 Some communities recite the following kinnah:
 Al Heykhali Ḥevli KeNahasḥ Noshe (על היכלי חבלי כנחש נושך ולשממות ציון אשב בחושך), composed by rabbi Israel Najara

Morning kinnot

See קינות תשעה באב (Hebrew)

Kinnot in memory of the Holocaust

Although the fast of Tisha B'Av was founded to mourn the destruction of the Temple, over the years other travails of the Jewish Diaspora have been added to its observance and memorialized in the kinnot.  Despite this, few kinnot have been composed in the last several centuries, and none of them had entered the standard kinnot service.

After the Holocaust, many people felt that it was inappropriate to mourn on Tisha b'Av for the destruction of cities during the Middle Ages without mourning the even greater tragedy of the Holocaust.  For this reason, many people recommended the composition and recitation of new kinnot to commemorate the Holocaust.  These people, including many important rabbis, argued that in every generation, kinnot were composed to address the difficulties of that generation.  Some added that it was essential to incorporate such kinnot into the Jewish liturgy, lest the Holocaust be forgotten by future generations.  One popular Kinnah on the Holocaust is Eli Eli Nafshi Bekhi, composed by Yehuda Leib Bialer.

However, many other rabbis dissented on the grounds that they could not create new kinnot because the existing kinnot were holy and were composed by the greatest individuals of their respective generations, but today there is nobody who can write like them.  Others claimed that any individual community could recite new Kinnot as they wished, but only the greatest rabbis would have the authority to institute new Kinnot into the communal service in the entire Jewish world community.

Rabbi Yaakov Ariel claims that the kinnot service, unlike the Siddur and other Jewish rituals, was not created by authority of the rabbis, but rather developed based on the acceptance of communities and the decisions of the printers who produced printed copies.  Thus the new kinnot could gradually enter the accepted roster of kinnot.  However, since many congregations now recite kinnot to commemorate the Holocaust, this may become an integral part of the service without a formal decision.

See also
 Zionides
 City Lament

References

External links
 Sephardic Pizmonim Project, Ekha and Tisha B'Ab
 Piyut.co.il - Texts and archival recordings of Sephardic and Ashkenaz Qinot (Hebrew)
 Shaar-binyamin.com - Recordings of the qinot according to the Syrian Jewish community of Damascus
 Kinnot L'Tisha B'Av Nusakh Ashkenaz (Hebrew language)
 Tishah B'Av - A Guide to the Service (including a synopsis of the kinnot)
 Kinot Insights from Members of the YU Torah Mitzion Kollel of Chicago
 A Sample of Kinnot and Their Translations for Consecutive Reading on Tisha B´Av

Jewish liturgical poems
Tisha B'Av